This list of the prehistoric life of New Jersey contains the various prehistoric life-forms whose fossilized remains have been reported from within the US state of New Jersey.

Precambrian
The Paleobiology Database records no known occurrences of Precambrian fossils in New Jersey.

Paleozoic
 †Archaeocyathus
 †Centroceras
 †Centroceras marcellense
 †Cladopora 
 †Coenites 
 †Cordilleracyathus – tentative report
  †Favosites 
 †Leiorhynchus
 †Leiorhynchus limitare
 †Leptodesma
 †Leptodesma laevis
 †Ophileta – type locality for genus
 †Ophileta polygyratus – type locality for species
 †Styliolina
 †Styliolina fissurella

Mesozoic

Selected Mesozoic taxa of New Jersey

 Acipenser
 Acteon
 †Adocus – type locality for genus
  †Adocus beatus – type locality for species
 †Aenona
 †Agerostrea
 †Allognathosuchus – or unidentified related form
 Amauropsis
 Amia
 †Amyda
 †Anatalavis
 †Anatalavis rex – type locality for species
 †Anchisauripus
 †Anchisauripus tuberosus
 †Ankylosaurus
 †Anomia
 †Anomoeodus
  †Anomoepus
 †Apatopus
 †Arambourgiania – or unidentified comparable form
 Arca
 †Argoides
 Astarte
 Astrangia
  Atractosteus
 †Atreipus
 Attagenus
 †Avellana
 †Axonoceras
 †Baculites
 †Baculites haresi
 †Baculites ovatus
 †Baculites scotti – tentative report
 †Baikuris
 †Baikuris casei – type locality for species
 Barbatia
  †Belemnitella
 †Belemnitella americana
 Bernaya
 †Bottosaurus
 †Bottosaurus harlani – type locality for species
 Botula
 †Botula ripleyana
 Brachaelurus
  †Brachychampsa – or unidentified comparable form
 †Brontozoum
  †Brownimecia – type locality for genus
 †Brownimecia clavata – type locality for species
 Caestocorbula
 †Caestocorbula crassaplica
 †Caestocorbula crassiplica
 †Caestocorbula percompressa
 Callianassa
 †Callianassa mortoni
 †Calliomphalus
 †Calliomphalus americanus
 Cardita
 †Catopygus
  †Ceratodus
 Cerithium
 Cheilotrichia
 †Chelone
 Chiloscyllium
 †Chirotherium
 †Chirotherium lulli – type locality for species
 Chlamys
 †Cimoliasaurus
  †Cimolomys – or unidentified comparable form
 †Cimolomys clarki
 †Cirroceras
 Clavagella
 †Clidastes
 Cliona
 †Coelosaurus
 †Coelosaurus antiquus – type locality for species
 †Coelurosaurichnus
  Corbula
 †Corsochelys
 Crassostrea
 †Crenella
 †Crenella elegantula
 †Crenella serica
 †Cretolamna
 †Cretolamna appendiculata
  †Cretoxyrhina
 †Cretoxyrhina mantelli
 †Crocodilus
 Cucullaea
 †Cucullaea capax
 †Cucullaea littlei
 Culicoides
 Cuspidaria
 †Cuspidaria jerseyensis
 †Cylindracanthus
 †Cymella
 Cyzicus – or unidentified comparable form
 Dasyatis
  †Deinosuchus
 †Deinosuchus rugosus
 †Dentalium
 †Dentalium leve
 †Didelphodon – or unidentified comparable form
 †Didymoceras
 †Diplocynodon
 †Diplurus – or unidentified comparable form
  †Discoscaphites
 †Discoscaphites conradi
 †Discoscaphites gulosus
 †Dolicholatirus
 Dosinia
  †Dryptosaurus – type locality for genus
 †Dryptosaurus aquilunguis – type locality for species
 Edaphodon
 †Edaphodon mirificus
 †Edmontosaurus
 †Elasmosaurus
 †Elasmosaurus orientalis – type locality for species
  †Enchodus
 †Enchodus gladiolus
 †Epitonium
 †Epitonium sillimani
 †Euspira
 †Eutrephoceras
  †Exogyra
 †Exogyra cancellata
 †Exogyra costata
 †Exogyra ponderosa
 Fasciolaria
 † Gegania
 †Gervillia
 Ginglymostoma
 Glossus
 Glycimeris
 Glycymeris
 †Glycymeris rotundata
 †Gonyaulax
 †Graculavus – type locality for genus
  †Grallator
 †Grimaldiella – type locality for genus
 †Gryphaea
  †Hadrosaurus – type locality for genus
 †Hadrosaurus cavatus – type locality for species
 †Hadrosaurus foulkii – type locality for species
 †Hadrosaurus minor – type locality for species
  †Halisaurus
 †Halisaurus platyspondylus
 Hemiscyllium
 Heterodontus
 †Hoploparia
 †Hoploscaphites
 †Hybodus
 †Hyposaurus
 †Hyposaurus rogersii – type locality for species
 †Hypsibema
 †Hypsibema crassicauda
  †Hypsognathus – type locality for genus
 †Hypsognathus fenneri – type locality for species
 †Hypuronector – type locality for genus
 †Hypuronector limnaios – type locality for species
  †Icarosaurus – type locality for genus
 †Icarosaurus siefkeri – type locality for species
  †Inoceramus
 †Inoceramus proximus
 †Ischyodus
 †Ischyodus bifurcatus
 †Ischyrhiza
 †Ischyrhiza mira
 †Jeletzkytes
 †Jeletzkytes nodosus – or unidentified comparable form
 †Jerseyempheria – type locality for genus
 †Kouphichnium
 †Laornis – type locality for genus
 †Laornis edvardsianus – type locality for species
  †Leidyosuchus
 Leptoconops
 Lima
 Limatula
 † Limonia
 †Linearis
 Linuparus
 †Liodon
 †Lissodus
 Lithophaga
 Lopha
 †Lopha falcata
 †Lopha mesenterica
  Lunatia
 Martesia
  †Megalocoelacanthus
 †Megalocoelacanthus dobiei
 †Menuites
 †Metoicoceras
 †Milnesium
 †Modiolus
 †Modiolus sedesclaris
 †Modiolus sedesclarus
 †Morea
  †Mosasaurus
 †Mosasaurus conodon – type locality for species
 †Mytilus – tentative report
 †Neithea
 †Neithea quinquecostata
 †Nostoceras
  Nucula
 †Nucula camia
 †Nucula cuneifrons
 †Nucula percrassa
 †Odaxosaurus – or unidentified comparable form
 Odontaspis
 Oecobius – tentative report
 †Ophiomorpha
 Orchestina
 †Osteopygis – type locality for genus
 Ostrea
 †Oxyrhina
 †Oxyrhina desorii
  †Pachydiscus
 Pagurus
 †Palaeoniscus
 †Palaeopagurus – tentative report
 †Palaeotringa – type locality for genus
 Panopea
 †Paracupes
 †Paralbula
 †Paranomia
 †Parrisia – type locality for genus
 †Pecten
 †Peritresius
  Pholadomya
 †Pholadomya occidentalis
 Pholas
 †Pinna
  †Placenticeras
 †Plagiostoma
 †Plesiosaurus
 Plicatula
 †Plioplatecarpus
 †Plioplatecarpus depressus – type locality for species
  †Plumalexius – type locality for genus
 †Plumalexius rasnitsyni – type locality for species
 Polinices
 †Pristis
 †Procolpochelys
  †Prognathodon
 †Prognathodon rapax – type locality for species
 †Protocardia
 †Pseudocorax
 †Pteria
  †Pterotrigonia
 †Pterotrigonia angulicostata
 †Pterotrigonia cerulea
 †Pterotrigonia eufalensis
 †Pterotrigonia eufaulensis
 †Ptychotrygon
 Pycnodonte
 †Pycnodonte mutabilis
 †Pycnodonte vesicularis
 Rangia – tentative report
 Rhinobatos
 †Rhombodus
 Ringicula
 †Ringicula clarki
  †Rutiodon
 †Rutiodon carolinensis
 †Sargana
 †Sauropus
 †Scapanorhynchus
 †Scapanorhynchus texanus
 †Scaphites
 †Scaphites hippocrepis
 †Sclerorhynchus
 †Scoyenia
 Segestria – tentative report
  †Semionotus
 Serpula
 †Serratolamna
 †Serratolamna serrata
 †Spathopria – type locality for genus
  †Sphecomyrma – type locality for genus
 †Sphecomyrma freyi – type locality for species
 †Sphecomyrma mesaki – type locality for species
 †Sphenodiscus
 †Sphenodiscus lobatus
 Spondylus
  Squalicorax
 †Squalicorax kaupi
 †Squalicorax pristodontus
 Squatina
 †Stegobium
 †Stegomus
 †Stephanodus
 †Steropoides
 †Symmorphus – tentative report
 †Tanytrachelos
 †Tanytrachelos ahynis
 †Taphrosaurus
  Tellina
 †Telmatornis – type locality for genus
 Tenagodus
 †Tenea
  †Thoracosaurus
 †Tomodon – type locality for genus
 †Tomodon horrificus – type locality for species
 Trachycardium
 †Trachycardium eufaulensis
 †Trigonia
 Trionyx
 Turbinella
 Turbonilla
  Turritella
 †Turritella bilira
 †Turritella trilira
 †Turritella vertebroides
 †Volviceramus
 Vulsella – or unidentified comparable form
 Xanthosia
  †Xiphactinus
 †Xiphactinus audax

Cenozoic

Selected Cenozoic taxa of New Jersey

  †Acrodus
 Acteocina
 Aetobatus
 Amyda
 Anachis
 Anadara
 †Anadara ovalis
 †Anadara transversa
 Angulus
 Anomia
 †Anomia simplex
 Arca
 Architectonica
 Argopecten
 †Argopecten gibbus
  †Argopecten irradians
 Argyrotheca
 Astarte
 †Astarte castanea
 Astrangia
 †Astrangia danae
 Astyris
 †Astyris lunata
 Athleta
 Atrina
  †Aturia
 Balanophyllia
 Balanus
 Barbatia
 Barnea
 Bison
 †Bonellitia – or unidentified comparable form
 †Bootherium
  †Bootherium bombifrons
 Buccinum
 †Buccinum undatum
 Busycon
 †Busycon carica
 †Busycon perversum
 Busycotypus
 †Busycotypus canaliculatus
 Cadulus
 †Calappilia
 Callianassa – tentative report
 Calliostoma
 Calyptraea
  Carcharias
 Carcharodon
  †Carcharodon hastalis
 Cardita
 Carditamera
 Cardites
 †Castoroides
 †Catopygus
 Cerithiopsis
 †Cerithiopsis emersonii
  †Cervalces
 Chaetopleura
 †Chaetopleura apiculata
 Chama
 †Chama congregata
 Chelone
 †Chesapecten
 Chlamys
 Cidaris
 †Cistella
  Clavilithes
 Clementia
 Cliona – tentative report
  Conus
 Corbula
 †Coscinopleura
 †Crassinella lunulata
 Crassostrea
 †Crassostrea virginica
 Crenella
 †Crenella glandula
 Crepidula
 †Crepidula convexa
  †Crepidula fornicata
 †Crepidula plana
 †Cretolamna
 †Cretolamna appendiculata
 †Crocodilus
  Crocodylus
 Crucibulum
 †Crucibulum striatum
 Cucullaea
 Cumingia
 Cuspidaria
 Cyclocardia
 Cylichna
 †Cylindracanthus
 Cythara – tentative report
 Cytherea
 Dasyatis
 Dentalium
 Diastoma
 †Diatryma
  †Diceratherium
 Diodora
 †Diplodonta punctata
 Discinisca
 †Dolicholatirus
 Donax
 †Donax fossor
 Dosinia
 Echinarachnius
  †Echinocorys
 †Echinopsis
 †Ecphora
 Edaphodon
 †Enchodus
 Ensis
 †Ensis directus
 †Eosphargis
  †Eosuchus
 Epitonium
 †Epitonium humphreysii
 Equus
 Ervilia
 Eupleura
 †Eupleura caudata
 Euspira
 †Euspira heros
 †Euspira triseriata
 †Eutrephoceras
 Fasciolaria – report made of unidentified related form or using admittedly obsolete nomenclature
 Flabellum
 Fossarus – tentative report
  Galeocerdo
 †Galeocerdo aduncus
 Galeodea
 Gemma
 †Gemma gemma
 Geukensia
 †Geukensia demissa
 Ginglymostoma
 Glans
  †Glomerula
 Glossus
 Glycymeris
 †Glycymeris subaustralis
 †Gorgonella
 †Gryphaea
 †Hamulus – or unidentified comparable form
 Haustator – or unidentified comparable form
 Hemipristis
  †Hemipristis serra
 Heptranchias
 †Heptranchias howelli – type locality for species
 Hespererato
  Hexanchus
 Hiatella
 †Hiatella arctica
 Hydroides
 †Hyposaurus – type locality for genus
 †Hyposaurus rogersii – type locality for species
 Ilyanassa
 †Ilyanassa obsoleta
 †Ilyanassa trivittata
 Ischadium
 †Ischadium recurvum
  †Ischyodus
 †Ischyrhiza
 †Ischyrhiza mira
  Isognomon
 Isurus
 Kurtziella
 †Kurtziella cerina
 Laevicardium
 †Laevicardium mortoni
 Lamna
 Latirus
 Libinia
  †Libinia emarginata
 †Linthia
 Lithophaga
 Littoraria
 †Littoraria irrorata
 Lunatia
 Lunularia
 Macoma
 †Macoma balthica
 Macrocallista
 Mactra
 †Mammut
  †Mammut americanum
 †Mammuthus
  †Megalonyx
 Melampus
 †Melampus bidentatus
 Melanella
 †Menoceras
 Mercenaria
 †Mercenaria mercenaria
 Mesodesma
 Mitrella
 Modiolus
 †Modiolus modiolus
 Morus
 Mulinia
 †Mulinia lateralis
 Murex
 Murexiella
 †Mya
 †Mya arenaria
  Myliobatis
 Mytilus
 †Mytilus edulis
  Nassarius
 †Nassarius acutus
 †Nassarius vibex
 Natica – or unidentified comparable form
 Neptunea
 †Neptunea lyrata
 Neverita
  Nucula
 †Nucula proxima
 Odobenus
  †Odobenus rosmarus
 Odontaspis
 Olivella
 †Olivella mutica
 †Ophiocoma – tentative report
 Ophiomusium
 Ostrea
 †Ostrea compressirostra
 †Otodus
  †Otodus megalodon
 Ovibos
 †Ovibos moschatus
 †Oxyrhina
 †Oxyrhina desorii
 †Palaeocarcharodon
 †Palaeophis
 Paliurus
 Pandora
 Panopea
 Panopeus
 Pecten
 Penion – or unidentified comparable form
  †Pentacrinites
 †Peritresius
 †Peronidella
 Petricola
 †Petricola pholadiformis
 Phoca
 Phyllodus
 Phyllonotus
  Physeter
 Pinna
 Pitar
 †Pitar morrhuanus
 †Plagiochasma
 Pleuromeris
 †Pleuromeris tridentata
  Pleurotomaria
 Plicatula
 †Plicatula gibbosa
 Polinices
  Pristis
 †Prosynthetoceras
 Protula
 Psammechinus
 Pseudoliva
 Pteria – tentative report
  †Puppigerus
 Pycnodonte
 Pyrgocythara
 †Pyrgocythara plicosa
 Rangia
 Rangifer
 Rhinoptera
 †Rhizocrinus
  †Rhombodus
 †Rotularia
 Scaphella
  Scyliorhinus
 Seila
 †Seila adamsii
 Semele
  Serpula
 Serpulorbis
 Sinum
 †Sinum perspectivum
 Siphonalia
 †Solarium
 Solenosteira
 †Solenosteira cancellaria
 †Sphyraenodus
  †Squalodon – type locality for genus
 Squalus
 Squatina
 Stellatoma
 †Stellatoma stellata
 Stewartia
 Stramonita
 †Striatolamia
 Strioterebrum
 Tagelus
 †Tapiravus
  Tapirus
 Tectonatica
 †Tectonatica pusilla
 Tellina
 Tenagodus – tentative report
 †Tenea
 Teredo
  †Thecachampsa
 †Thecachampsa antiqua
 †Thoracosaurus
 Tibia
  Trichechus
 Triphora
 Trochita
 Turbonilla
 †Turbonilla interrupta
  Turris – report made of unidentified related form or using admittedly obsolete nomenclature
 Turritella
 †Turritella vertebroides
 Tylocidaris
 Tympanuchus
 Urosalpinx
 †Urosalpinx cinerea
 †Veleda
 Venericardia
 Venus
 Xenophora
  Xiphias
 Yoldia
 †Zygaena

References
 

New Jersey-related lists
New Jersey